Nicholas Anthony Yorke (born April 2, 2002) is an American professional baseball player in the Boston Red Sox organization. He was selected 17th overall by the Red Sox in the 2020 MLB draft.

Amateur career
Yorke attended Archbishop Mitty High School in San Jose, California, where he played baseball. He started his high school career as a shortstop, then played as a designated hitter following shoulder surgery. In 2019, his junior year, he was named to The Mercury News All-Bay Area Team. Yorke completed his high school career with a .457 batting average with 134 hits, 100 runs, and 77 RBIs through 94 games. Yorke had committed to play college baseball for the Arizona Wildcats baseball team.

Professional career
Yorke was selected by the Boston Red Sox with the 17th overall pick of the 2020 MLB draft, where he was positioned by MLB.com as a second baseman. He signed with the Red Sox on July 7, 2020, for a $2.7 million bonus. During the start-delayed 2020 season, the Red Sox added Yorke to their pool of reserve players on September 17. Although the minor league season was cancelled, he was invited to participate in the Red Sox' fall instructional league. Following the 2020 season, Yorke was ranked by Baseball America as the Red Sox' number nine prospect.

In 2021, Yorke was a non-roster invitee to Red Sox spring training at Fenway South in Florida. He began the 2021 season in Low-A, with the Salem Red Sox. After hitting .323 with ten home runs, 47 RBIs, and 11 stolen bases over 76 games for Salem, Yorke was promoted to the High-A Greenville Drive in the second half of August. Over 21 games with Greenville to end the season, he batted .333 with four home runs and 15 RBIs.

Yorke returned to Greenville to start the 2022 season. In May 2022, he was ranked 33rd in the list of baseball's top 100 prospects by Baseball America. After the season, he was selected to play in the Arizona Fall League.

References

Further reading

External links

SoxProspects.com
Perfect Game profile

2002 births
Living people
Sportspeople from Newport Beach, California
Baseball players from California
Baseball infielders
Salem Red Sox players
Greenville Drive players